MacFamilyTree is a commercial genealogy program for macOS which allows users to build family trees and document genealogical research by adding data about family members including pictures, documents, and sound clips. It provides integration with iCloud to synchronize data across multiple devices and features the ability to generate and publish HTML web pages from saved family trees.

MacFamilyTree creates data visualizations including a classic descendant chart, timelines, and a virtual globe indicating locations of key events in the lives of subjects. Reports can be generated for individual entries or entire families.

MobileFamilyTree is a mobile application available for iPad, iPhone and iPod Touch users with near-identical features, optionally allowing users to synchronize with MacFamilyTree using iCloud integration.

While internally it uses the Core Data API to store and modify information, it imports and exports GEDCOM files for compatibility with other genealogical tools.

See also
Comparison of genealogy software

References

MacFamilyTree